Čata is a village and municipality in the Levice District in the Nitra Region of south-west Slovakia.

History
In historical records the village was first mentioned in 1386.

Geography
The village lies at an altitude of 132 metres and covers an area of 14.771 km².
It has a population of about 1200 people.

Facilities
The village has a public library a gym and a  football pitch.

Genealogical resources

The records for genealogical research are available at the state archive "Statny Archiv in Nitra, Slovakia"

 Roman Catholic church records (births/marriages/deaths): 1700-1896 (parish B)
 Reformated church records (births/marriages/deaths): 1784-1895 (parish B)

See also
 List of municipalities and towns in Slovakia

External links
http://www.statistics.sk/mosmis/eng/run.html
Surnames of living people in Cata

Villages and municipalities in Levice District